Charlie Brown (29 January 1878 –  18 June 1944) was a South African international rugby union player who played as a forward.

He made three appearances for South Africa in 1903.

References

South African rugby union players
South Africa international rugby union players
1878 births
1944 deaths
Rugby union forwards
People from Ga-Segonyana Local Municipality
Place of death missing
Rugby union players from the Northern Cape
Western Province (rugby union) players